The 1990 Belgian Grand Prix was a Formula One motor race held at Spa-Francorchamps on 26 August 1990. It was the eleventh race of the 1990 Formula One World Championship. The race was the 48th Belgian Grand Prix. It was the 36th to be held at Spa-Francorchamps and the seventh since the circuit was extensively redeveloped in 1979. The race was held over 44 laps of the seven kilometre circuit for a race distance of 301 kilometres.

Brazilian driver Ayrton Senna claimed his fifth race victory for the season in his McLaren MP4/5B taking a four-second win over the Ferrari 641 driven the reigning world champion, Frenchman Alain Prost. It was Senna's fourth victory in the Belgian Grand Prix, and his third in succession. Senna's Austrian team mate Gerhard Berger finished third, while further back Maurício Gugelmin scored a point for the Leyton House team.

Three attempts were made to start the race, the first two being red-flagged after collisions. Aguri Suzuki's Lola LC90 was eliminated after the first start, Paolo Barilla's Minardi M190 after the second.

Off-track, Nigel Mansell was rumoured to be reconsidering his prior announcement to retire, and he was strongly linked with Williams. He had demanded undisputed number one status as a driver, and various assurances from engine supplier Renault, which Frank Williams had told him were impossible.

The Onyx team pulled out of Formula One before the weekend of the race, for financial reasons, having competed at this level for a season and a half.

Qualifying

Pre-qualifying report
With the withdrawal of the Onyx team, Ligier were relieved of the requirement to pre-qualify, and returned to the main qualifying pool. They had only been required to pre-qualify twice, which both cars did comfortably on both occasions.

Therefore there was slightly less pressure on the other entrants in the pre-qualifying session. Olivier Grouillard was fastest in the Osella, the second time he had been top of the Friday morning time sheets, and the first time since round six in Mexico. Second fastest was Yannick Dalmas in the AGS, his fifth successful pre-qualification of the season from eleven attempts. Third fastest was Bertrand Gachot in the improving Coloni, and this was the first time in 1990 that he had pre-qualified. Fourth was Gabriele Tarquini in the other AGS, his fourth pre-qualification this season.

Missing the cut in fifth and sixth positions were the EuroBruns of Roberto Moreno and Claudio Langes. The margin of failure was fairly narrow however, with Moreno 0.36 seconds behind Tarquini, and Langes just over a second further behind. Bruno Giacomelli was slowest again in the Life, with the L190 refusing to start until the closing stages of the session. The car managed five slow laps before an electrical failure. "Nothing impressive," Giacomelli stated. He also announced that work was restarting on the chassis to allow a Judd CV V8 engine to be fitted by round 13 in Portugal, in place of the disastrous in-house W12.

Pre-qualifying classification

Qualifying report
The two McLarens were on the front row, with Senna ahead of Berger. Prost in the Ferrari was third ahead of Boutsen and the second Ferrari of Mansell.

Qualifying classification

Race

Race report
The first start had seen two incidents. The first of them saw  Nelson Piquet in the Benetton push the Ferrari 641 of Nigel Mansell off the track. In the second of the incidents, the Tyrrell of Satoru Nakajima collided with the Brabham of Stefano Modena, which caused the race to be stopped.

The second start had seen Senna's McLaren take the lead with the Williams of Thierry Boutsen slicing his way into second place from fourth, whilst rival Alain Prost had dropped down to fifth place after starting third. However, there was another first lap accident when the Minardi of Paolo Barilla crashed heavily at Eau Rouge, leaving debris all over the track in that area and causing the race to be stopped again.

The third start, however, had proven to be cleaner, as Senna held on to the lead ahead of teammate Gerhard Berger, Prost, Boutsen, Patrese and Alessandro Nannini in the leading Benetton. Mansell in the second Ferrari went into the pits on lap 11 with handling problems. He was able to rejoin the race but retired eight laps later. Meanwhile back up front, Prost took second ahead of Berger but then pitted for tyres. The margin between Senna and Prost was only two seconds when they made their second pit stops for fresh tyres. Both the Williams cars of Patrese and Boutsen were soon forced to retire with gearbox problems by lap 22. The pit stops of Senna and Prost had allowed Nannini (who was once again planning to go the full race distance without a pit stop) to take second place. Prost was able to overtake Nannini and Berger attempted to do the same thing but was unable to pass until lap 41 when Nannini ran wide at La Source, which allowed Berger to take third place from the Italian. Ayrton Senna took his fifth win of the season by 3.5 seconds over Prost, whilst the rest of the top six were rounded out by teammate Berger, Nannini, Piquet in the second Benetton and Mauricio Gugelmin in the Leyton House.

Race classification

Championship standings after the race

Drivers' Championship standings

Constructors' Championship standings

 Note: Only the top five positions are included for both sets of standings.

References

Belgian Grand Prix
Belgian Grand Prix
Grand Prix
Belgian Grand Prix